Dustin Wood (born May 21, 1981, in Scarborough, Ontario) is a Canadian former professional ice hockey defenceman.

Playing career
He spent his amateur career in the Ontario Hockey League with the Peterborough Petes. Wood made his professional debut in the 2002–03 season with the Trenton Titans of the East Coast Hockey League. After a five-year career in the American Hockey League, Wood signed with German team, ERC Ingolstadt of the DEL for the 2007-08 season.

After helping Ingolstadt reach the playoffs, Wood then signed with fellow DEL team, the Kassel Huskies for the 2008–09 season.

In October 2009, Wood signed with Anyang Halla (Asia League) for a 3-month deal to fill Jon Awe's spot. On December 16, 2009 the club extended Wood's contract for the rest of the season. In May 2010, Anyang Halla re-signed Wood to a one-year-deal.

October 2, 2011 He was announced as signing for the Coventry Blaze of the British EIHL, to replace John Gordon who was released from the squad.

In August 2013, he returned to Japan and signed for another stint with Anyang Halla on a one-year contract. In August 2014, Wood left the Asia League and signed with Arystan Temirtau, a team in the Kazakhstan top tier league for the 2013–14 season.  He had previously played for the team during the 2012–13 season.

Career statistics

Awards and achievements

2009–10 - Asia League (ALH) Champion
2010–11 - Asia League (ALH) Champion

References

External links

1981 births
Adirondack IceHawks players
HL Anyang players
Arlan Kokshetau players
Arystan Temirtau players
Bridgeport Sound Tigers players
Canadian ice hockey defencemen
Coventry Blaze players
HSC Csíkszereda players
EHC Lustenau players
ERC Ingolstadt players
Houston Aeros (1994–2013) players
Kassel Huskies players
Living people
Manitoba Moose players
Sportspeople from Scarborough, Toronto
Ice hockey people from Toronto
Peterborough Petes (ice hockey) players
Springfield Falcons players
Syracuse Crunch players
Trenton Titans players
Utah Grizzlies (AHL) players
Canadian expatriate ice hockey players in England
Canadian expatriate ice hockey players in Austria
Canadian expatriate ice hockey players in Germany
Canadian expatriate ice hockey players in South Korea
Canadian expatriate ice hockey players in Romania
Canadian expatriate ice hockey players in Kazakhstan